Oryctometopia is a genus of moths of the family Pyralidae.

Species
 Oryctometopia fossulatella Ragonot, 1888
 Oryctometopia venezuelensis Amsel, 1956

References

Phycitinae